The 2002 Taça de Portugal Final was the final match of the 2001–02 Taça de Portugal, the 62nd season of the Taça de Portugal, the premier Portuguese football cup competition organized by the Portuguese Football Federation (FPF). The match was played on 12 May 2002 at the Estádio Nacional in Oeiras, and opposed third division side Leixões and Sporting CP. Sporting CP defeated Leixões 1–0 to claim their thirteenth Taça de Portugal.

As Sporting CP claimed both league and cup double in the same season, cup runners-up Leixões faced their cup final opponents in the 2002 Supertaça Cândido de Oliveira at the Estádio do Bonfim in Setúbal.

Match

Details

References

2002
2001–02 in Portuguese football
Sporting CP matches
Leixões S.C.